John McHugh Sr. (6 March 1924 – 21 July 2019) was an American World War II veteran who participated in the D Day invasion, the Battle of Normandy and the Battle of the Bulge. He was in the 1st Infantry Division and was awarded the Silver Star and the Bronze Star. The State of New York placed him in its Veterans Hall of Fame. His hometown Whitestone, New York has co-named a street after him.

Military service

After high school graduation in 1942 McHugh was drafted and completed basic training at Fort McClellan in Alabama. After basic training he went to New York and was transported on the Queen Elizabeth to the United Kingdom. McHugh was in the 1st Infantry Division which landed at Normandy on D-Day and went on to fight at the Battle of Normandy and the Battle of the Bulge. The State of New York placed him in its Veterans Hall of Fame.

D-Day Invasion
McHugh and the First Infantry Division (also known as Big Red One) arrived in landing craft at Omaha Beach on D-Day, 6 June 1944, at 7:30am. McHugh and roughly 10 soldiers disembarked. As soon as they exited the landing craft, it was destroyed by a German shell. McHugh had been assigned to carry a tripod for a machine gun, however the soldier carrying the machine gun was killed in action so McHugh began crawling up the beach without a weapon. He spent the day in the sand avoiding German gunfire.

Referring to his own experience on D-day, McHugh said, "It's hell day, it really is a hell day. Scared stiff, petrified and running like hell… It was a lot of bodies around, I didn't want to be one of them.” His experience has been cited as emblematic of the dire experiences and vanishing memories of D-Day vets. McHugh sent the money that he earned in the army to his mother (Catherine); his father John was deceased.

Post war
When the war ended, he was in the Army of Occupation. After seven months he was honorably discharged with the rank of corporal.

Awards
Silver Star
Bronze Star
Army Presidential Unit Citation Presidential unit citations for the Battle of Crucifix Hill and Battle of Hürtgen Forest
World War II Victory Medal
Army of Occupation Medal 
European-African-Middle Eastern Campaign Medal
Silver Arrowhead for his participation in the invasion of Normandy.
Fort Eger badge - awarded by Belgium for McHugh's efforts during the war in Belgium.

Later life and death
After the war, McHugh worked as a Transit Authority conductor and a private investigator for a security firm.

McHugh died in his sleep 21 July 2019 at his home in Whitestone, New York. His hometown Whitestone New York approved a street co-named in honor of McHugh in 2019.

Personal life
McHugh was a first generation American, born in Union City, New Jersey; his parents were Irish immigrants. He came from a long line of soldiers. His father (John McHugh) fought heroically in World War I and was shot six times in the Battle of the Argonne forest, and also gassed. McHugh's grandfather fought in the American Civil War.

After World War II ended, John McHugh Sr. returned to the United States and married his childhood sweetheart Rosie McGee on 16 August 1947. Together they had three sons: John, Brian and Tim. He had three grandchildren and seven great-grandchildren.

See also 
 Operation Overlord
 Normandy landings
 Liberation of France
 German occupation of Luxembourg during World War II
 Operation Spring Awakening

External links
John McHugh Sr. On Fox News June 6, 2019
 DDay-Overlord: a fight for freedom The Normandy campaign: history, documents, testimonies, maps
 U.S. Army's official interactive D-Day website
 Battle of the Bulge – Official webpage of the United States Army.

References

1924 births
2019 deaths
United States Army personnel of World War II
Military personnel from New York (state)
People from Whitestone, Queens
Recipients of the Silver Star
United States Army soldiers
People from Union City, New Jersey
Conductor (rail)